Gareth Wade (born 11 January 1991) is an English cricketer. He made his first-class debut on 2 April 2017 for Northamptonshire against Loughborough MCCU as part of the Marylebone Cricket Club University fixtures. He made his Twenty20 debut for Northamptonshire in the 2018 t20 Blast on 17 August 2018.

References

External links
 

1991 births
Living people
Sportspeople from Hexham
Cricketers from Northumberland
English cricketers
Northamptonshire cricketers
Northumberland cricketers